Tollin Productions (or simply known as TP and formerly known as Marquee/Tollin/Robbins (or simply known as MTR or M/T/R)) is an American movie and television production company operated by Mike Tollin and Brian Robbins in 1994. Joe Davola was also an unofficial partner in the company and co-produced many of the company's productions along with Robbins and Tollin from 1994-2013 and 2021-present.

History
Tollin/Robbins Productions was formed by Brian Robbins and Mike Tollin in 1994 with early shows and early films were sports documentaries. At Warner Bros., he signed up its first overall deal, that of creator Ryan Murphy, who was of Popular at that time.

In 2002, Tollin/Robbins Productions (TRP) agreed to a two-year first look movie deal with Paramount Pictures while having a TV joint venture agreement with Warner Bros. With the Paramount agreement, T/RP hired Caitlin Scanlon to head the film division which produced or directed 2-3 films a year.

While two of their pilots were in consideration for pick up on ABC in April 2003, Tollin/Robbins agreed to a two-year development deal, including a two-year option, profit sharing and outside sales, with Touchstone Television. In May, T/RP's agreement with Warner Bros. expired.

Under the ABC Studio (formerly Touchstone TV) deal, two series were developed, NBC drama Inconceivable and ABC comedy Savages, that reached the small screen in the 2005–2006 season but where quickly canceled. NBC Universal TV Studio ended their TV production agreement in June 2006 with T/RP with no series produced under the deal.

In March 2007 with the expiration of T/RP's production deal with Disney, Tollin and Robbins decided to scale back operations of T/RP with the both of them taking on project independent of T/RP. Robbins signed a two-year first look production deal with DreamWorks, while Tollin had two movies in the works with one at Lionsgate and the other with Greenestreet Pictures and Mandeville Films. T/RP would handle existing production and various projects already under development.

In March 2010, Tollin/Robbins sued Warner Bros. over claims of misdealing in the amount of $100 million over the profits of the Smallville series in selling the show to affiliates The WB and The CW and by later including DC Comics as a profit participate. In January 2013, Tollin Productions settled out of court with Warner Bros.

Movies
Hardwood Dreams
Hank Aaron: Chasing the Dream
The Show
Good Burger for Nickelodeon Movies
Varsity Blues
Big Fat Liar
The Perfect Score co-produced with Paramount Pictures
The Shaggy Dog for Walt Disney Pictures
Hardball
Summer Catch
Ready to Rumble
Radio
Coach Carter
 Dreamer
Wild Hogs
 Norbit for DreamWorks Pictures

List of TV shows

References

External links 
 Tollin/Robbins Productions at the IMDb
 Tollin/Robbins Productions official website

Television production companies of the United States
1994 establishments in the United States
American companies established in 1994
Mass media companies established in 1994